The 12th Syracuse Grand Prix was a motor race, run to Formula One rules, held on 25 April 1963 at Syracuse Circuit, Sicily. The race was run over 56 laps of the circuit, and was won easily by Swiss driver Jo Siffert in a Lotus 24.

Results

References
 "The Grand Prix Who's Who", Steve Small, 1995.
 "The Formula One Record Book", John Thompson, 1974.
 Race results at www.silhouet.com 

Syracuse Grand Prix
Syracuse Grand Prix
Syracuse Grand Prix
Syracuse Grand Prix